Claire Elizabeth Cooper (born 26 October 1980) is a British actress, best known for portraying Jacqui McQueen in Channel 4 soap opera Hollyoaks, a character she played from 2006 to 2013.

Cooper co-owns clothing rental boutique The Closet in Liverpool with Hollyoaks co-stars Jennifer Metcalfe and Leah Hackett.

Early life 
Cooper was a British champion gymnast for 10 years.

Cooper attended the Guildford School of Acting.

Career 
Cooper has appeared in various British television shows, including a two-part episode on Waking the Dead in 2004. She made appearances on Coronation Street and Waterloo Road in 2006.

Cooper made her on-screen debut in Hollyoaks in September 2006. In 2009 she played a character in the second series of Hollyoaks Later. In late 2010 she was in an hour-long spin-off episode called Hollyoaks: King of Hearts.

In 2016, Cooper played the part of Claire in the second series of In the Club.

Personal life
Cooper married her boyfriend Emmett J. Scanlan on 31 December 2015 in New York City. On 8 May 2020, she announced she was pregnant with their first child. On 18 July 2020, she gave birth to a boy named Ocean. On 12 November 2022, she gave birth to her second child, a daughter named Fiáin.

Filmography

Awards and nominations
Cooper won Best Actress at British Soap Awards in 2013 and Best Family at Inside Soap Awards in 2009. She has also received several nominations:

(*) means there were two main round of nominations for that category. For that particular category, nominated means she only made the first round of nominations and shortlisted means she made the second and final round of nominations to be decided by either the public vote or by a judging panel.

References

External links

 

Living people
British television actresses
Actors from Wakefield
Actors from Halifax, West Yorkshire
British soap opera actresses
Actresses from Yorkshire
Alumni of the Guildford School of Acting
English soap opera actresses
1980 births